The Popeye Show (Originally titled I'm Popeye) is an American cartoon anthology series that premiered on October 29, 2001, on Cartoon Network. Each episode includes three Popeye theatrical shorts from Fleischer Studios and/or Famous Studios. The show is narrated by Bill Murray (not to be confused with the film actor of the same name), who gives the audience short facts about the history of the cartoons as filler material between each short. Animation historian Jerry Beck served as a consultant and Barry Mills served as writer and producer. A total of 45 episodes were produced, consisting of a total of 135 shorts.

Significance 
Prior to the premiere of The Popeye Show, most television airings of theatrical Popeye cartoons bore the logos of Associated Artists Productions, the company that bought the films from Paramount Pictures for television distribution. This is due to the films having been sold in the 1950s, when most movie studios did not want to be associated with television. As a result, A.A.P. was required to replace the original Paramount logos with their own. For The Popeye Show, efforts were made to present these films as close to their original theatrical form as possible: some of the cartoons shown were copies that actually had their original Paramount titles intact, while others needed to have their original titles simulated through the process of digital video editing.

The show focused mostly on the Fleischer Popeye shorts and early Famous Studios shorts that were originally filmed in black and white. For all episodes, the first two shorts were from this era. Sometimes the third cartoon would be a color cartoon from Famous Studios, but on many occasions an entire episode would entirely be made of black-and-white cartoons. While selecting the color entries that would air, the only ones that were initially selected were those that were in the Turner vaults with their original titles. The only color cartoons to have their original titles recreated were those shown in the last episode of Season 3, and all episodes of Season 4. 

In season 1, an original copy of Popeye, the Ace of Space (1953) with its original titles was shown for the first time on TV. This particular cartoon was originally shown in 3D, and therefore had a unique opening sequence. It also had a unique ending sequence that was not shown on syndication prints because it involved the Paramount logo being formed from the smoke of Popeye's pipe. The black and white short The Hungry Goat (1943) was kept from being shown in earlier seasons because it required extra attention to recreate the ending as close to original as possible. The original ending involved Popeye's nemesis in the short, a goat, laughing at Popeye while watching the end of the very cartoon they were in, and, like The Ace of Space, involved the Paramount logo.

The 1945 short Tops in the Big Top, which did not open with the standard Popeye theme music, but had a rendition with a circus theme, had its original soundtrack restored for the program. Similarly, a version of We're on Our Way to Rio (1944) was prepared with the opening soundtrack restored, but the show was cancelled before it could be included in any episodes.

Cartoons skipped during original run 
Two episodes from Season 1 were initially skipped and did not make their TV debut until reruns. The reason was that the two episodes had cartoons that the executives at Cartoon Network would not pass for unedited airings. Episode #10 was originally supposed to have Popeye the Sailor, which was a Betty Boop cartoon in which Popeye makes his theatrical debut. This particular cartoon had a scene at the carnival where Popeye and Bluto play a ball-toss game where the target is an African American stereotype. Episode #11 had the short Happy Birthdaze, in which Popeye murders his suicidal Navy buddy Shorty in a scene that is usually cut from most TV broadcasts. When Episode #10 finally aired, I Eats My Spinach replaced Popeye the Sailor, while Episode #11 aired with no changes made, and Happy Birthdaze was shown uncut.

Ethnic censorship 
Several shorts are not seen in or out of this package due to heavy racial stereotyping, despite this Anthological series being aired as part of Adult Swim in later runs. Pop-Pie a la Mode, The Island Fling, and Popeye's Pappy have since been removed from circulation because of African-American stereotyping. You’re a Sap, Mr. Jap, Scrap the Japs, and Seein' Red, White, 'N' Blue are no longer shown on U.S. television due to Japanese stereotyping.

A later episode featured an unedited version of the World War II themed Spinach Fer Britain (1943), a cartoon in which Popeye battles Nazis. This particular cartoon is rarely shown outside of any scheduled airings of The Popeye Show. Another later episode featured stereotypes of Native-Americans in Wigwam Whoopee (1948), which featured Olive Oyl portrayed as an Indian Princess with depicted skin color. This episode is also rarely shown outside of any schedule airings of this anthology series. Wigwam Whoopee was available uncut on the Boomerang app until it was eventually removed in September 2021.

Episodes 
Below is an episode guide for The Popeye Show. All episodes are listed in production order. There were a few occasions where episodes were skipped and therefore did not air in their proper order.

Series overview

Season 1 (2001-2002)

Season 2 (2002)

Season 3 (2002)

Season 4 (2003)

See also 
 Popeye the Sailor filmography (Fleischer Studios)
 Popeye the Sailor filmography (Famous Studios)
 The Tex Avery Show
 ToonHeads
 The Bob Clampett Show
 Cartoon Alley

References

External links 
 

Cartoon Network original programming
2000s American animated television series
2000s American anthology television series
2001 American television series debuts
2003 American television series endings
American animated television spin-offs
American children's animated anthology television series
English-language television shows
Popeye the Sailor television series